John Kuol Chol Joh (born 9 November 1999), known as John Kuol Chol, is a South Sudanese footballer who lasted played as a defender for Kenyan Premier League club Kariobangi Sharks and the South Sudan national team.

References

External links

1999 births
Living people
People from Jonglei State
South Sudanese footballers
Association football defenders
Chemelil Sugar F.C. players
F.C. Kariobangi Sharks players
Kenyan Premier League players
South Sudan international footballers
South Sudanese expatriate footballers
South Sudanese expatriate sportspeople in Kenya
Expatriate footballers in Kenya
South Sudanese expatriate sportspeople in Australia
Expatriate soccer players in Australia
Port Melbourne SC players
National Premier Leagues players